German submarine U-319 was a Type VIIC/41 U-boat of Nazi Germany's Kriegsmarine during World War II.

She carried out just one patrol, but did not sink any ships.

The boat was sunk on 15 July 1944 by a British aircraft in the North Sea.

Design
German Type VIIC/41 submarines were preceded by the heavier Type VIIC submarines. U-319 had a displacement of  when at the surface and  while submerged. She had two shafts and two  propellers.

U-319 was fitted with five  torpedo tubes (four fitted at the bow and one at the stern), fourteen torpedoes, one  SK C/35 naval gun, (220 rounds), one  Flak M42 and two  C/30 anti-aircraft guns. The boat had a complement of between forty-four and sixty.

Service history

The submarine was laid down on 18 November 1942 by the Flender Werke yard at Lübeck as yard number 319, launched on 16 October 1943, and commissioned on 4 December under the command of Oberleutnant zur See Johannes Clemens.

She served with the 4th U-boat Flotilla for training, from 4 December 1943 to 1 June 1944 and the same organization for operations until her sinking on 15 July 1944.

Having made the short journey from Kiel in Germany to Stavanger in Norway in June 1944, she commenced her first and only patrol on 5 July.

Fate
U-319 was sunk by a British B-24 Liberator of 206 Squadron RAF in the North Sea, southwest of Lindesnes, on 15 July 1944. Fifty-one men from the U-boat died. There were no survivors. The aircraft failed to return; it was presumably shot down by the U-boat's anti-aircraft defences. A crewman's body was picked up the next day. Clemens' remains were recovered and interred at the military cemetery in Stavanger.

See also
 Battle of the Atlantic (1939-1945)

References

Bibliography

External links

German Type VIIC/41 submarines
U-boats commissioned in 1943
1943 ships
World War II submarines of Germany
Ships built in Lübeck
U-boats sunk by depth charges
U-boats sunk by British aircraft
Ships lost with all hands
U-boats sunk in 1944
Maritime incidents in July 1944